Asura parallina is a moth of the family Erebidae. It is found in Burma.

References

parallina
Moths described in 1894
Moths of Asia